Martin S. Schwartz (Buzzy, born March 23, 1945) is a Wall Street trader who made his fortune successfully trading stocks, futures and options. He received national attention when he won the U.S. Investing Championship in 1984. Schwartz is the author of Pit Bull: Lessons from Wall Street's Champion Day Trader.

Education
Graduated with a degree from Amherst College in 1967 and Received an MBA from Columbia University in 1970.

Career
Schwartz served in the U.S. Marine Corps Reserves from 1968 to 1973 and completed his commitment with rank of captain. After working several years as a financial analyst at E. F. Hutton, Schwartz accumulated $100,000, quit the firm, and bought a seat on the American Stock Exchange where he began trading stocks options and futures.

In 1985, Schwartz began his own fund in which he would manage other people's money as well as his own. He wrote the book Pit Bull: Lessons from Wall Street's Champion Day Trader, based on that professional life.

Other endeavors
Schwartz is a second Champion Horse owner.

Bibliography

References

Further reading

External links
 

American derivatives traders
American financial analysts
American hedge fund managers
American money managers
American philanthropists
American racehorse owners and breeders
American stock traders
Amherst College alumni
Columbia Business School alumni
Living people
Stock and commodity market managers
United States Marines
1945 births